Milan Lazić (Serbian Cyrillic: Милан Лазић; born 27 October 1982) is a Serbian retired football defender.

External links
 Milan Lazić

1982 births
Living people
Sportspeople from Požarevac
Serbian footballers
FK Mladi Radnik players
FK Voždovac players
Serbian SuperLiga players
Association football defenders